Linda Sole (born 1950 in Swindon, Wiltshire, England) is an awarded and prolific British writer of romance and suspense novels since 1980, she also writes under the pseudonyms of Lynn Granville, Anne Herries, Emma Quincey, Cathy Sharp, Rosie Clarke 
and Juliana Linden'. In 2004, her novel A Damnable Rogue  won the Love Story of the Year Award by the Romantic Novelists' Association.

Biography
Linda M. Sole was born on 1950 in Swindon, Wiltshire, England, UK, the daughter of a schoolteacher and a ladies hairdresser. At 9, her family moved to Ely in Cambridgeshire, where she attended the local school. After leaving High School at 15, she worked as a hairdresser in her father's business until she married at 18. She worked in her husband's antique shop, where she combined her job with writing since 1976.

Sole sold her first novel in 1979 at Robert Hale, she published four novels under the pseudonym of Lynn Granville . She published her first novels as Anne Herries at Mills & Boon, now also wrote at Severn House under this pseudonym and under her real name Linda Sole. She also published a novel under the pseudonym of Juliana Linden, and two gothic novels under the pseudonym of Emma Quincey.

Sole and her husband, continued living in Cambridgeshire, with a second home in Norfolk, during years they spend their holidays in Spain.

Bibliography

As Lynn Granville

Single novels
 The Witch Child (1980)
 Bitter Sweet (1981)
 Dark Blows the Wind (1984)
 Pagan Fires (1984)

As Anne Herries

Single novels
 Devil's Kin (1981)
 The Wolf of Alvar (1983)
 Beware the Conqueror (1985)
 Demon's Woman (1985)
 Raphael (1986)
 The Wild Heart (1986)
 The Flame and the Sword (1987)
 The Spanish Witch (1987)
 The Sleeping Demon (1987)
 The Devil's Mercenary (1988)
 For Love and Liberty (1988)
 Rosanna and the Rake (1988)
 The Marriage Chests (1993)
 An Ideal Match (1998)
 Satan's Mark (2000)
 A Matter of Honour (2000)
 The Most Precious Gift (2000)
 Racing Hearts (2000)
 Rosalyn and the Scoundrel (2001)
 Sara's Secret (2001)
 The Abducted Bride (2001)
 A Spanish Practice (2001)
 Captive of the Harem (2002)
 The Sheikh (2002)
 A Damnable Rogue (2003)
 A Wicked Wench (2004)
 Milady's Revenge (2004)
 My Lady, My Love (2005)
 Ransom Bride (2005)
 The Unknown Heir (2008)
 The Homeless Heiress (2008)
 The Rake's Rebellious Lady (2008)
 The Pirate's Willing Captive (2010)
 Bought for the Harem (2011)
 A Stranger's Touch (2012)

The Steepwood Scandal Series Multi-Author
1. Lord Ravensden's Marriage (2001)
9. Counterfeit Earl (2002)

The Elizabethan Season Series Multi-Author
2. The Adventurer's Wife (2004)
3. Lady in Waiting (2004)

Banewulf Dynasty
 A Perfect Knight (2005)
 A Knight of Honour (2005) aka A Knight of Honor (US title)
 Her Knight Protector (2005)

English Civil War
 Lovers and Enemies (2005)
 Love Lies Weeping (2006)
 The Seeds of Sin (2006)

The Hellfire Mysteries
 An Improper Companion (2006)
 A Wealthy Widow (2006)
 A Worthy Gentleman (2007)

The Horne Sisters
 Marianne and the Marquis (2007)
 Married By Christmas (2007)
 Marrying Captain Jack (2007)

Upstairs, Downstairs Saga
 Love Is Not Enough (2008)
 Love and War (2008)
 Forbidden Love (2008)

A Season in Town
 A Country Miss in Hanover Square (2009)
 An Innocent Debutante in Hanover Square (2009)
 The Mistress of Hanover Square (2009)

Melford Dynasty
 Forbidden Lady (2010)
 The Lord's Forced Bride (2010)
 Her Dark and Dangerous Lord (2011)

Secrets and Scandals
 The Disappearing Duchess (2011)
 The Mysterious Lord Marlowe (2012)
 The Scandalous Lord Lanchester (2012)

As Linda Sole

Single novels
 Lovers and Sinners (1990)
 The Last Summer of Innocence (1991)
 Shadow Players (1992)
 All Their Days (1995)
 This Land, This Love (1997)
 Spring Will Come (1997)
 Flame Child (1999)
 Song for Athena (2003)
 A Kind of Loving (2008)
 Cassie's Sheikh (2008)
 Chateau Despair (2009)
 All My Sins (2010)
 Tears Will Not Save Them (2010)

Emma Robinson's Story
 The Ties That Bind (2000)
 The Bonds That Break (2000)
 The Hearts That Hold (2001)

Jenny Heron's Story
 The Rose Arch (2001)
 A Cornish Rose (2001)
 A Rose in Winter (2002)

London's Girls Saga
 Bridget (2002)
 Kathy (2004)
 Amy (2004)

Country House Saga
 Give Me Tomorrow (2004)
 A Bright New Day (2005)
 Wish Down the Moon (2006)

Sarah Beaufort Mysteries
 Miscarriage of Justice (2007)
 Justice Is Served (2007)
 A Different Kind of Justice (2008)

Family Feud
 The Lie (2008)
 A Promise Made (2009)
 Winners and Losers (2009)
 Briar Patch (2011)

As Emma Quincey

Single novels
 Her Mother's Sins (1997)
 Forgotten Sins (1998)

As Juliana Linden

Single novelsIn the Name of Honour'' (1998)

References and sources

1950 births
Living people
Date of birth missing (living people)
People from Swindon
English romantic fiction writers
RoNA Award winners
Pseudonymous women writers
20th-century English novelists
21st-century English novelists
20th-century British women writers
21st-century British women writers
20th-century pseudonymous writers
21st-century pseudonymous writers
Women romantic fiction writers
Writers of historical romances